The 1986–87 Campionato Sammarinese di Calcio season was the 2nd season since its establishment. It was contested by 9 teams, and S.P. La Fiorita won the championship.

Regular season

Results

Championship playoff

Semifinals
S.C. Faetano 2-0 G.S. Dogana
S.P. La Fiorita 0-0 (pen 5-4) S.S. Montevito

Final
S.P. La Fiorita 2-0 S.C. Faetano

References
San Marino - List of final tables (RSSSF)

Campionato Sammarinese di Calcio
San
Campionato